Clinidium marginicolle is a species of ground beetle in the subfamily Rhysodinae. It was described by Edmund Reitter in 1889. It is known Azerbaijan and northeastern Iran  (Kopet Dag).

Clinidium marginicolle measure  in length.

References

Clinidium
Beetles of Asia
Insects of Azerbaijan
Insects of Iran
Beetles described in 1889
Taxa named by Edmund Reitter